Nandalal Borgohain City College, established in 1992, is a major and general degree college situated in Dibrugarh, Assam. This college is affiliated with the Dibrugarh University.

Departments

Arts
Assamese
English
History
Education
Economics
Philosophy
Political Science
Sociology
Anthropology

References

External links
http://nlbcitycollege.org.in/

Universities and colleges in Assam
Colleges affiliated to Dibrugarh University
Educational institutions established in 1992
1992 establishments in Assam